Deep is the third studio album from Belfast band Silent Running, released by Atlantic in 1989.

Background
Deep was the band's second album for Atlantic Records, following their 1987 album Walk on Fire. With the release of Deep, the band toured extensively but disbanded shortly after, citing a lack of record company support. Both "Deep in the Heart of Nowhere" and "Local Hero" were released as promotional CD singles in the US.

Recording
The first four tracks of the album were produced by the band themselves with Frankie LaRocka and Peter Denenberg, who both engineered the album. The rest of the tracks were produced by John Eden, whilst LaRocka and Deneberg remixed the tracks produced by Eden. The album was LaRocka's first attempt at production work, where he also played drums on part of the album. Originally, LaRocka had signed the band while working in the A&R department at Atlantic Records.

Drummer Ian Gault departed the band after the initial recording of Deep in 1988 and was therefore replaced by Gary Kirby. Around the same time, Paul Rocks joined the band on keyboards, and the band finished recording the Deep album in New York.

Prior to Paul Rocks joining, the previous keyboardist Alex White had left the group back in 1985 to work with Joan Armatrading, resulting in the band relying on session musicians such as Adrian Lee (Mike + The Mechanics) and Clive Gates (New Music and Ian Curnow, Talk Talk.

All tracks are original, where the music was written by all three main members of the band; vocalist Peter Gamble, bassist Richard Collett and guitarist Tony Scott, discounting new members Kirby and Rocks, with the lyrics being written solely by vocalist Peter Gamble. Some tracks featured a writing credit to Gault, as they were completed before he left the group.

Release
Deep was released by Atlantic Records in the United States and Europe. The album was made available on all streaming platforms by Warner Music on 23 July 2021.

Critical reception

Glorydaze Music wrote, "Earlier fans of the band would've turned away after their debut, as both Walk On Fire and Deep are quite some way removed from their original direction moulded in the style of Simple Minds and U2. On the other hand, AORsters and melodic rockers would've welcomed them with open arms."

Track listing

Personnel 
Silent Running
 Peter Gamble - vocals, producer
 Tony Scott - guitar, producer
 Richard Collett - bass, Producer
 Ian Gault - drums, drum Programming
 Gary Kirby - drums
 Paul Rocks - keyboards

Additional personnel
 John Eden - producer (tracks 5-10) 
 Frankie LaRocka - producer, engineer, remixer, drums
 Peter Denenberg - producer, engineer, remixer
 Tom Leinbach - assistant engineer (tracks 1-4)
 Clive Gates - keyboards
 Adrian Lee - keyboards
 Joe Bonadio - percussion
 Steve Sidelnyk - percussion
 Adrian Baker, Amy Fradon, Carole Godden, Leslie Ritter - backing vocals

References

1989 albums
Silent Running (band) albums
Atlantic Records albums